Niewiadomski is a surname. Notable people with the surname include:

 Eligiusz Niewiadomski (1869–1923), Polish painter and art critic
 Krzysztof Niewiadomski (born 1970), Polish luger
 Mariusz Niewiadomski (born 1959), Polish footballer
 Zbigniew Niewiadomski (born 1946), Polish sprint canoer

Polish-language surnames